Mark Bircher is a retired Marine Corps Reserve brigadier general, commercial pilot (Boeing 777), lawyer, scholar, and former Blue Angels pilot. He was a Republican Party candidate in Florida's 13th congressional district special election, 2014. He was the Republican candidate for the 2016 election in Florida's 13th congressional district.

Bircher is a graduate of the Naval Academy and the Navy Fighter Weapons School (TOPGUN). He became a fighter pilot and flew the A-4 Skyhawk and F/A-18 Hornet. He was awarded the Bronze Star. He flew with the Blue Angels for three years. In 2003 he deployed to Iraq. In 2009 he retired from the Marine Corps Reserve as a Brigadier General.

Bircher ran as a conservative candidate in the Republican primary in the 2014 special election for Florida's 13th congressional district. Bircher finished third with 24% of the vote, behind State Representative Kathleen Peters (29%) and lobbyist David Jolly (45%) who went on to defeat Alex Sink in the March 11, 2014 special election.

Political positions
Supports a balanced budget
Opposes the Affordable Care Act

Endorsements
Combat Veterans For Congress PAC
Former Congressman Allen West
Republican Liberty Caucus

References

Living people
Florida Republicans
Commercial aviators
Year of birth missing (living people)